LPE may refer to:

 Lambda Pi Eta, a collegiate honor society
 LAN Perú, an airline
 Lapeer (Amtrak station), a train station
 LimeWire Pirate Edition, file sharing software
 Lingenfelter Performance Engineering, a car modifier
 Liquid phase epitaxy, a semiconductor manufacturing process
 Liquid phase exfoliation, a method of processing chemical solutions
 Lone pair electrons, an atomic valence structure
 Local privilege escalation, a type of software exploit
 London Press Exchange, an advertising agency
 Lysophosphatidylethanolamine, a type of organic chemical
 Longitude of the periapsis, a dimension of orbit
 Lepki language, of Western New Guinea